The Baltic Sea Action Group (BSAG) is an independent foundation that does concrete work on behalf of the Baltic Sea, one of the most polluted seas in the world. BSAG is based in Helsinki, Finland but it operates throughout the entire Baltic Sea area. BSAG should not be confused with Baltic Sea Advisory Council (BSAC), which is one of the regional advisory councils that advise the European Commission and EU Member States on matters relating to management of the fisheries in each respective sea area.

BSAG's methods of operation are innovative and concentrated on problem solving. The foundation is an independent actor with a vast network of professionals for help and guidance. BSAG aims to execute the salvation work of the sea and accelerate the implementation of the Baltic Sea Action Plan by HELCOM. Operations are carried out with comprehensive co-operation between the private and public sectors throughout the entire Baltic Sea area.

BSAG gathers commitments to action to help the Baltic Sea from all kind of organizations. Commitments can be direct or indirect, financial or non-financial. In the best cases both the Sea and the commitment maker benefit substantially.

In February 2010, BSAG organized Baltic Sea Action Summit together with the president of the Republic of Finland and the prime minister of Finland. The Heads of State and more than 140 companies and organizations around the Baltic Sea made concrete commitments for wellbeing of the Sea. BSAG continues to work on these new commitments and also follows the old ones.

Baltic Sea Action Summit process materialized next as a high-level Baltic Sea Forum on April 5-6, 2013 in St. Petersburg, Russia. The forum hosted by Prime Minister Dmitry Medvedev gathered together Prime Ministers and Ministers of Environment of Baltic Sea countries as well as representatives of Russian and international businesses.

Baltic Sea Action Group operates under the Foundation for a Living Baltic Sea to execute concrete projects to restore the sea.

Names
The official name of the foundation is the Living Baltic Foundation. It has been translated into all 14 languages of the Baltic Sea basin, which also reflects the problem arising from the linguistic and cultural diversity of the region. For the sake of convenience and unity of understanding, the Living Baltic Foundation uses the working name BSAG – Baltic Sea Action Group or Baltic Sea Action Group.

Name of the Foundation:

 Finnish — Elävä Itämeri säätiö;
 English — Foundation for a Living Baltic Sea;
 Swedish — Stiftelsen för ett levande Östersjön;
 Russian — Living Baltica Foundation;
 German — Stiftung Lebende Ostsee;
 Estonian, Elava Läänemere fond;
 Latvian — Fonds dzīvībai Baltijas jūrā;
 Lithuanian — Gyvos Baltijos Jūros Fondas;
 Norwegian — Stiftelsen Den levende Østersjøen;
 Danish — Foreningen for en levende Østersø;
 Polish — Fundacja Nadzieja Dla Bałtyku;
 Belarusian — Fundatsia "Zhiva Baltyka";
 Czech — Nadace pro živé Baltské moře;
 Slovak — Nadácia na ochranu Baltického mora;
 Ukrainian — Foundation "Zhiva Baltika".

Mission
"An integrated approach and concrete targeted actions"

BSAG's mission is to restore the ecological balance of the Baltic Sea. The Role of the Fund is to unite the actions of all parties necessary to change the situation in the Baltic for the better. BSAG focuses on concrete actions and interactions based on finding solutions; projects are implemented through voluntary commitments. The parties that have undertaken obligations implement projects using their own resources. The Foundation draws public attention to the problems of the Baltic Sea and raises awareness in this area.

Tasks
 To unite various active circles to work together to protect the Baltic Sea
 Act as a catalyst and initiator of specific projects in all problematic areas of the Baltic Sea.

Sources

Baltic Sea